Jason Hender (born 26 April 1971) is a British swimmer. He competed in the men's 200 metre breaststroke event at the 1992 Summer Olympics.

References

External links
 

1971 births
Living people
British male swimmers
Olympic swimmers of Great Britain
Swimmers at the 1992 Summer Olympics
Sportspeople from Manchester
British male breaststroke swimmers
20th-century British people